Laurence Jackson (16 September 1900 in Carnwath, South Lanarkshire – 27 July 1984 in Biggar, South Lanarkshire) was a Scottish curler. He was part of the Royal Caledonian Curling Club team that won the first Olympic Gold medal in curling at the inaugural Winter Olympics in Chamonix, France, in 1924.

He was the son of fellow gold-medalist Willie Jackson.

See also
 Curling at the 1924 Winter Olympics

References

External links
 

1900 births
1984 deaths
Scottish male curlers
British male curlers
Olympic curlers of Great Britain
Olympic gold medallists for Great Britain
Olympic medalists in curling
Curlers at the 1924 Winter Olympics
Medalists at the 1924 Winter Olympics
Scottish Olympic medallists